The Model 17 Eierhandgranate (German for "egg hand grenade") is a small defensive and offensive hand grenade which was used by Germany during World War I. The average soldier could throw it 40 meters or farther. It was more portable than the heavier Kugelhandgranate and less awkward to handle than the stick grenade. The body of the grenade was initially smooth and thus difficult to hold so the design was modified with the addition of a raised band to provide better grip.

A similar grenade called the Model 39 grenade was later introduced by Germany and used in World War II.

References 

 Imperial German Eierhandgranate 1917, WWI
 Passion & Compassion 1914-1918 : WW1 militaria and technical documentation - german grenades

1916 establishments in Germany
1920s disestablishments in Germany
World War I German infantry weapons
Hand grenades of Germany